The Shen'ao Fishing Port is a fishing harbor in Ruifang District, New Taipei, Taiwan.

Name
The port has been nicknamed Fan Zi Ao due to its shape representing the look of tribal leader.

History
The port used to have more than 20 fishing vessels which were used for fish catching and recreational purpose. However, a new regulation enacted in 2012 mandated the fishing vessels used for recreational purpose pass the inspection for passenger vessels standards. Therefore, the port failed to renew the license for recreational vessels. In 2018, the 310-meter long Haitian Walkway viewing platform was constructed next to the port.

Features
The port has a footpath designed for people to have a lookout of Jinguashi and Jiufen.

See also
 New Taipei

References

Ports and harbors of New Taipei